Sir Charles Raymond Burrell, 10th Baronet (born 27 August 1962) is an English landowner, conservationist and founder of the Knepp Wildland, the first large-scale lowland rewilding project in England, which was created in the early 2000s when he stopped conventional farming on  of land surrounding the ancestral family home at Knepp Castle in West Sussex.

Personal life
Burrell spent his early years on his parents' farm in the British colony of Southern Rhodesia and then in Australia but returned to England for secondary education. He was educated at Millfield and the Royal Agricultural College. He succeeded to the baronetcy upon the death of his father, Sir John Raymond Burrell, 9th Baronet, on 29 May 2008.

He married the travel writer Isabella Elizabeth Nancy Tree on 2 December 1993. They have two children, Nancy (born 29 May 1995) and Edward (born 10 October 1996).

Knepp Estate management

Burrell lives in West Sussex with his family on the ancestral  Knepp Wildland estate in a castellated mansion built for the Burrell family around 1808 by John Nash (built next to the ruins of the medieval Knepp Castle). Burrell inherited the estate at the age of 21 and managed it using conventional intensive farming for 17 years before starting to convert it using rewilding principles in 2000.

Awards & recognition for the Knepp Wildland project
 2015 People Environment Achievement (PEA) award for Nature
 2015 Innovative & Novel Project award in the UK River Prize for the River Adur restoration project
 2017 Anders Wall Award for special contribution to the rural environment in the European Union
 2017 Gold, Best Guided Tour of the Year, Beautiful South Awards

Appointments
As of January 2021, Burrell is Chair of the Beaver Advisory Committee for England and Foundation Conservation Carpathia, vice-chair for Rewilding Britain and on the board of The Arcadia Fund, Ingleby Farms Environment Committee, the Endangered Landscapes Programme and the Bronze Oak Project.

References

1962 births
Baronets in the Baronetage of Great Britain
Charles Raymond
English farmers
Living people
People educated at Millfield
Alumni of the Royal Agricultural University